Harmandalı is a village in the Ortaköy District, Aksaray Province, Turkey. Its population is 1,078 (2021). Before the 2013 reorganisation, it was a town (belde). It is the presumed location of Nyssa, an ancient city and former bishopric in Cappadocia, which remains a titular see in the Eastern Orthodox Church and Latin Catholic Church.

References 

Villages in Ortaköy District, Aksaray